Massera may refer to:

 Emilio Eduardo Massera (1925-2010), Argentine military officer
 José Luis Massera (1915–2002), Uruguayan mathematician and politician